Christian Anthony Colón (born May 14, 1989) is a Puerto Rican former professional baseball infielder. He played in Major League Baseball (MLB) for the Kansas City Royals, Miami Marlins, and Cincinnati Reds.

Career
Colón attended Midway High School in Waco, Texas, as a freshman, and Taylorsville High School in Taylorsville, Utah, for his sophomore season, before his family moved to California. He then attended Canyon High School in Anaheim, California. Colón was drafted in the tenth round of the 2007 MLB Draft by the San Diego Padres. He chose instead to attend California State University, Fullerton, where he played college baseball for the Cal State Fullerton Titans baseball team.

Kansas City Royals
With the Titans, Colón was an All-American shortstop. He was then selected with the fourth overall pick of the 2010 MLB Draft by the Kansas City Royals. Colón was added to the 40-man roster on November 20, 2013.

Colón batted .296 for the Omaha Storm Chasers of the Class AAA Pacific Coast League in 2014, before he was promoted to the major leagues on June 30. After entering the 2014 American League Wild Card Game as a pinch hitter, he knocked in the tying run on an infield single and scored the winning run on a single by Salvador Pérez.

Colón served as a utility player during the 2015 season. He entered Game 5 of the 2015 World Series (his first appearance in the playoffs) in the top of the 12th as a pinch hitter. After not making a plate appearance for four weeks, he hit a single to score Jarrod Dyson for the winning run to clinch the World Series, marking the first time in history that a player in his first at bat in a World Series delivered the Series-winning run.

In 2017, Raúl A. Mondesí won the Royals' starting second baseman position, and Colón competed with Whit Merrifield for a role on the Opening Day roster. The Royals included Colón on the Opening Day roster, but designated him for assignment on May 10.

Miami Marlins
The Miami Marlins claimed Colón off of waivers on May 16. He was designated for assignment on June 23, 2017. He elected free agency on November 6, 2017.

Atlanta Braves
On December 6, 2017, Colón signed a minor league deal with the Atlanta Braves. He was released on May 9, 2018.

New York Mets
On May 18, 2018, Colón signed a minor league deal with the New York Mets. He elected free agency on November 2, 2018.

Cincinnati Reds
On December 4, 2018, Colón signed a minor league deal with the Cincinnati Reds. On September 16, 2019, the Reds selected Colón's contract. Colón was outrighted off the Reds roster following the 2019 season. He became a free agent following the 2019 season. Colón later re-signed with the Reds on another minor-league deal in the offseason. On July 24, 2020, Colón had his contract selected to the 40-man roster. On August 14, Colón was designated for assignment. On August 17,  Colón cleared waivers and was outrighted to the Reds alternate training site.

Kansas City Monarchs
On February 10, 2021, Colón signed with the Kansas City Monarchs of the American Association of Professional Baseball.

Toronto Blue Jays
On April 24, 2021, Colón signed a minor league contract with the Toronto Blue Jays organization. 

On December 5, 2021, Colón announced his retirement from professional baseball.

Coaching career
On January 4, 2022, Colón was hired to serve as the assistant hitting coach for the Northwest Arkansas Naturals, the Double-A affiliate of his former team, the Kansas City Royals.

Personal life
Colón and his wife, Kayla, have 3 daughters.

See also
 List of Major League Baseball players from Puerto Rico

References

External links

Cal State Fullerton Titans bio

1989 births
Living people
Kansas City Royals players
Miami Marlins players
Cincinnati Reds players
Cal State Fullerton Titans baseball players
Wilmington Blue Rocks players
Northwest Arkansas Naturals players
Arizona League Royals players
Omaha Storm Chasers players
Surprise Saguaros players
Leones de Ponce players
People from Cayey, Puerto Rico
Major League Baseball shortstops
Major League Baseball players from Puerto Rico
New Orleans Baby Cakes players
Criollos de Caguas players
Gwinnett Stripers players
Las Vegas 51s players
Louisville Bats players
Liga de Béisbol Profesional Roberto Clemente infielders
Buffalo Bisons (minor league) players